Plainfield East High School, or PEHS is a four-year public high school located in Plainfield, Illinois, a southwest suburb of Chicago, Illinois, in the United States. It is part of the Plainfield Community Consolidated School District 202, which also includes three other high schools: Plainfield Central High School, Plainfield South High School, and Plainfield North High School.

History

The fourth high school in the Plainfield Community Consolidated School District 202 opened its doors for the very first time for the 2008-2009 academic school year on August 21, 2008. The school's first year only contained freshmen and sophomores. Each year, the school added another grade level. By the 2010-2011 school year, the school was finally operating with all four years (freshmen-seniors).

Athletics & activities

Athletics 
Plainfield East competes in the Southwest Prairie Conference and is a member of the Illinois High School Association.
The school fields teams in the following sports during the following seasons.

 Fall: Boys & Girls Cross Country, Boys Football, Boys & Girls Golf, Boys Soccer, Girls Swimming & Diving, Girls Tennis, Girls Volleyball
 Winter: Boys & Girls Basketball, Boys & Girls Bowling, Boys Swimming & Diving, Boys Wrestling, Competitive Cheerleading, Competitive Dance
 Spring: Boys Baseball, Boys Tennis, Boys Track & Field, Boys Volleyball, Girls Badminton, Girls Softball, Girls Soccer, Girls Track & Field
The Plainfield East Bengals Baseball program won their first ever IHSA State Championship in school history. No other sport has won a state championship at the school so far.

Band 
The band is directed by head director David Lesniak and assistant director Justin Kozarek. The band has many types of bands including standard concert band, marching band, jazz band, pep band, madrigal brass and recorders, percussion ensemble, and musical pit in the spring.

Concert Band 
During the school day, band members are separated into 4 concert bands of varying skill which include Concert Band, Symphonic Band 2, Symphonic Band 1, and Wind Ensemble (No Freshman in Wind Ensemble) Concert Band is split between woodwinds/percussion and saxophones/brass.

Marching Band 
Since its inception, the marching band has always been semi-competitive, attending competitions which included Pontiac Indian Showdown, Wheaton North, Chicagoland Marching Band Festival, Providence Catholic Marching Band Invitational, and Victor J. Andrew High School Marching Band Invitational. During the preseason of the 2015 season, it was decided that the marching band was to be split into a competitive and a curricular band, with the competitive band going to compete at Amos Alonzo Stagg High School and Downers Grove South High School annual preliminary marching competition making finals in the latter. The 2017-2018 year had become a curricular requirement for being in marching band.

Activities 
Plainfield East competes in the following IHSA sponsored activities: 
Chess Club
Newspaper
Marching Band
Scholastic Bowl

Clubs and Organizations 
Plainfield East has the following clubs and organizations:

ASL (American Sign Language) Club
Anime Club
Bengal Athletic Leadership (BALC)
Bengal Hangout
Bengal Spirit Club "Orange Crush"
Book Club
Computer Science Club
DECA
Design & Technology Club
Doctor Who Club
Fall Play

Fashion Club
Film & Cinematography Club
Fishing Club
French Club "Le Cercle Francais"
GSA (Gay Straight Alliance)
Global Citizen Club
Guitar Club
Intramurals
Key Club
Literary Review

Mathletes
Model Rocket Club
Muslim Students Association (MSA)
National Art Honor Society
National Honor Society
Newspaper
Ocean Conservation Club
Poetry Club
Politics Club
Potiphar Fan Club

Rise Above Club
Science Olympiad
Set Design
Spanish Club
Spanish Honor Society
Speech Club
Spring Musical
Step Club
Student Council
Womens Equality Club
Yearbook
Youth Alive

References

External links
 
 Plainfield High School Hockey Association Website

Public high schools in Illinois
Plainfield, Illinois
Schools in Will County, Illinois